Fyodor Savelyevich Khitruk (1 May 1917 – 3 December 2012) was a Soviet and Russian animator and animation director.

Biography
Khitruk was born in Tver (Russian Empire), into a Jewish family. He came to Moscow to study graphic design at the OGIS College for Applied Arts. He graduated in 1936 and started to work with Soyuzmultfilm in 1938 as an animator. From 1962 onwards, he worked as a director. His first film The Story of a Crime was an immense success. Today, this film is seen  as the beginning of a renaissance of Soviet animation after a two-decade-long life in the shadows of Socialist realism.

Diverging from the “naturalistic” Disney-like canons that were reigning in the 1950-60s in Soviet animated cartoons, he created his own style, which was laconic yet multi-level, non-trivial and vivid.

He is the director of outstanding animated short films including such classics as his social satire of bureaucrats, Chelovek v ramke (The Man in the Frame) (1966), the philosophic parable, Ostrov (Island) (1973) about the loneliness of a man in modern society, the biographical film Ein Junger Mann namens Engels - Ein Portrait in Briefen (1970), based on drawings and letters of young Engels, the parody Film, Film, Film (1968), and the anti-war film, Lev i byk (The Lion and the Bull) (1984).

In April 1993, Khitruk and three other leading animators (Yuri Norstein, Andrei Khrzhanovsky, and Eduard Nazarov) founded SHAR Studio, an animation school and studio in Russia. The Russian Cinema Committee is among the share-holders in the studio.

In 2008, he released a two-volume book titled The Profession of Animation. He is the grandfather of violin virtuoso Anastasia Khitruk.

Khitruk lived in Moscow, where he died in 2012, aged 95.

Filmography
 The Snow Queen (Снежная королева, 1957) (as animator)
The Story of a Crime (История одного преступления, 1962)
 Stompy (Топтыжка, 1964)
 Boniface's Holiday (Каникулы Бонифация, 1965)
 The Man in the Frame (Человек в рамке, 1966)
 Othello 67 (Отелло-67, 1967)
 Film, Film, Film (Фильм, фильм, фильм, 1968)
 Winnie-the-Pooh (Винни-Пух, 1969)
 The Young Friedrich Engels (Юноша Фридрих Энгельс, 1970)
 Winnie-the-Pooh Pays a Visit (Винни-Пух идет в гости, 1971)
 Winnie-the-Pooh and a Busy Day (Винни-Пух и день забот, 1972)
 Island (Остров, 1973)
 I Grant You A Star (Дарю тебе звезду, 1974)
 Icarus and the Wise Men (Икар и мудрецы, 1976)
 O Sport, You Are Peace! (О спорт, ты - мир!, 1981)
 Olympians (Олимпионики, 1982)
 The Lion and the Bull (Лев и бык, 1983)

Honours and awards

 Order of the Red Banner of Labour (1971)
 People's Artist of the RSFSR (1977)
 Order of the Patriotic War, 2nd class (1985)
 People's Artist of USSR (1987)
 Findling Award for his life's work (1987)
 Order of Merit for the Fatherland, 3rd class (1998)

Awards
 San Francisco International Film Festival — "Golden Gate" Prize for the film "The Story of a Crime" (1962)
 International Short Film Festival Oberhausen — Honorary diploma film "The Story of a Crime" (1963)
 All-Union Film Festival
First Prize in the animated films section, for "The Story of a Crime" (1964)
First Prize in the animated films section, the film "Boniface's Holiday" (1966)
 Venice Film Festival — Prize "Bronze Lion of St. Mark", the film "Toptyzhka" (1964)
 Cork Film Festival — Honorary Diploma for the film "Boniface's Holiday" 1965
 International Animation Film Festival in Mamaia — "Golden Pelican" Prize in the children's films category for "Boniface's Holiday" (1966)
 International Festival of Films for Children in Tehran — Encouraging diploma film "Boniface's Holiday" (1967)
 International Short Film Festival in Kraków — Honorary Diploma for "Film, film, film!" (1969)
 International Short Film Festival in Tampere — prize, the movie "Film, film, film!" (1970)
 International Leipzig Festival for Documentary and Animated Film — "Golden Dove" Prize for "The Young Friedrich Engels" (1970)
 International Short Film Festival Oberhausen - Award International Jury of Public Universities for "The Young Friedrich Engels" (1971)
 National Prize of the GDR — "The Young Friedrich Engels" (1971)
 International Animation Film Festival in New York — Silver Medal for the movie "Film, film, film!" (1973)
 All-Union Film Festival — Second Prize in the section of animated films, the movie "Island" (1974)
 Cannes International Film Festival — "Golden Palm" for short films, for "Island" (1974)
 International Short Film Festival in Kraków - Grand Prix "Golden Dragon of Wawel", Cash Prize, Diploma SIDALK for "The Island" (1974)
 Cannes Film Festival — Special Jury Prize (the main competition of short films), the film "I Grant You A Star" (1975)
 USSR State Prize — the film "Winnie the Pooh", "Winnie-the-Pooh Goes on a Visit", "Winnie-the-Pooh and the Day of Concern", "I Grant You A Star", "Island", "Film, film, film!" (1976)
 USSR State Prize — animation film "O Sport, You   the World!" 1982
 International Film Festival "Cinanima" in Espinho — Honorary Diploma in the category of films from 3 to 12 minutes for the movie "The Lion and the Bull" (1983)
 International Short Film Festival in Tampere — "For the mastery of the classical style of animation" for the film "The Lion and the Bull" (1983)
 International Festival of Animation films in Toronto — audience prize for the film "The Lion and the Bull" 1984
 Prize of the President of the Russian Federation in the field of literature and art (1998)
 Annecy International Animated Film Festival — Jury Award "for achievements in the profession" (2006)
 Nika Award — "Honour and Dignity" (the only cartoonist who has received a "Nika" in this category; 2006)
 Animafest Zagreb World Festival of Animated Film — Lifetime Achievement Award (2006)

See also
History of Russian animation
Konstantin Bronzit

References

External links
Fyodor Khitruk at animator.ru (complete filmography)
 (incomplete filmography)
Fyodor Khitruk at Animatsiya.net (where all of his films can be watched with English subtitles)
Biography
 Biography
 Information about OGIS
 Soyuzmultfilm's Homepage (requires Macromedia Flash)

1917 births
2012 deaths
Burials at Novodevichy Cemetery
Communist Party of the Soviet Union members
Soviet film directors
Russian animators
Russian artists
Russian Jews
Russian animated film directors
Soviet animation directors
Soviet animators
Jewish artists
Recipients of the Order "For Merit to the Fatherland", 3rd class
People's Artists of the USSR
People's Artists of the RSFSR
Recipients of the Order of the Red Banner of Labour
Recipients of the USSR State Prize
Recipients of the Nika Award
Academicians of the Russian Academy of Cinema Arts and Sciences "Nika"
Academic staff of High Courses for Scriptwriters and Film Directors
People from Tver